Simon Timothy Smith (born 1960) is a rugby union international who represented England between 1985 and 1986.

Early life
Simon Smith was born on 29 April 1960 in Baldock, Hertfordshire, and educated at the University of Lancaster and then did a postgraduate course at the University of Cambridge.  He played on the wing for Wasps

He played rugby for England in nine matches between 1985 and 1986.

References

1960 births
Living people
English rugby union players
England international rugby union players
Rugby union players from Hertfordshire
Middlesex County RFU players
Wasps RFC players